Likely Aerodrome  is located  west northwest of Likely, British Columbia, Canada.

References

Registered aerodromes in British Columbia
Cariboo Regional District